The 1948–49 Kentucky Wildcats men's basketball team represented University of Kentucky. The head coach was Adolph Rupp. The team was a member of the Southeast Conference and played their home games at Alumni Gymnasium.

Roster

NCAA tournament
East
 Kentucky 85, Villanova 72
Final Four
Kentucky 76, Illinois 47
Finals
 Kentucky 46, Oklahoma A&M 36

Rankings

Awards and honors

Team players drafted into the NBA

References

Kentucky
Kentucky
Kentucky Wildcats men's basketball seasons
Kentucky
NCAA Division I men's basketball tournament Final Four seasons
NCAA Division I men's basketball tournament championship seasons
1948 in sports in Kentucky
1949 in sports in Kentucky